Jintan Township (Mandarin: 金滩乡) is a township in Haiyan County, Haibei, Qinghai, China. In 2010, Jintan Township had a total population of 5,100: 2,636 males and 2,464 females: 1,073 aged under 14, 3,706 aged between 15 and 65 and 321 aged over 65.

References 
 

Township-level divisions of Qinghai
Haibei Tibetan Autonomous Prefecture